Dick Wright (5 December 1931 – October 2003) was an English footballer, who played as a goalkeeper in the Football League for Chester.

References

External links

Chester City F.C. players
Leeds United F.C. players
Association football goalkeepers
English Football League players
2003 deaths
Bradford City A.F.C. players
1931 births
English footballers